Aleksandr Valeryevich Antipenko (born 27 May 1982) is a former Russian footballer.

Club career
He made his Russian Premier League debut for FC Khimki on 10 March 2007 in a game against PFC Krylia Sovetov Samara. He spent 4 seasons in the RPL with Khimki and FC Sibir Novosibirsk.

External links
 

1982 births
Living people
People from Komsomolsk-on-Amur
Russian footballers
Russia under-21 international footballers
FC Mika players
FC Tom Tomsk players
FC Anzhi Makhachkala players
FC Khimki players
FC Sibir Novosibirsk players
Russian expatriate footballers
Expatriate footballers in Armenia
Armenian Premier League players
Russian Premier League players
FC Volgar Astrakhan players
FC Fakel Voronezh players
FC Kristall Smolensk players
FC Sakhalin Yuzhno-Sakhalinsk players
Association football forwards
FC Smena Komsomolsk-na-Amure players
FC Olimp-Dolgoprudny players
Sportspeople from Khabarovsk Krai